Terbium(IV) fluoride is an inorganic compound with a chemical formula TbF4. It is a white solid that is a strong oxidizer. It is also a strong fluorinating agent, emitting relatively pure atomic fluorine when heated, rather than the mixture of fluoride vapors emitted from cobalt(III) fluoride or cerium(IV) fluoride. It can be produced by the reaction between very pure terbium(III) fluoride and xenon difluoride, chlorine trifluoride or fluorine gas:
 2 TbF3 + F2 → 2 TbF4

Properties
Terbium(IV) fluoride hydrolyzes quickly in hot water, producing terbium(III) fluoride and terbium oxyfluoride (TbOF). Heating terbium(IV) fluoride will cause it to decompose into terbium(III) fluoride and predominantly monatomic fluorine gas.
 TbF4 → TbF3 + F•↑
The reaction will produce the mixed valence compound Tb(TbF5)3, which has the same crystal form as Ln(HfF5)3. 

Terbium(IV) fluoride can oxidize cobalt trifluoride into cobalt tetrafluoride:
 TbF4 + CoF3 → TbF3 + CoF4↑
It can fluoronate [60]fullerene at 320–460 °C.

When terbium(IV) fluoride reacts with potassium chloride and fluorine, it can produce the mixed valence compound KTb3F12. A mixture of rubidium fluoride, aluminium fluoride and terbium(IV) fluoride produces Rb2AlTb3F16.

References

attribution: This article was translated from the Chinese article :zh:四氟化铽

Terbium compounds
Fluorides